Laurence George Burnside (born 19 July 1946) is a former Bahamian cyclist. He competed in the 1000m time trial at the 1972 Summer Olympics.

References

1946 births
Living people
Bahamian male cyclists
Olympic cyclists of the Bahamas
Cyclists at the 1972 Summer Olympics
Cyclists at the 1970 British Commonwealth Games
Commonwealth Games competitors for the Bahamas
Place of birth missing (living people)